Oreta perfida is a moth in the family Drepanidae. It was described by William Warren in 1923. It is found in New Guinea, where it is known from Papua.

References

External links 
 The Papua Insects Foundation

Moths described in 1923
Drepaninae